The following is a pendulum based on the outcome of the 2010 federal election and changes since, including the redistributions of seats in South Australia and Victoria. It is a Mackerras pendulum, invented by psephologist Malcolm Mackerras, which works by lining up all of the seats held in Parliament (71 Labor, 72 Coalition, 1 Green, 1 KAP and 5 independent) according to the percentage point margin on a two-candidate-preferred basis. The two-party result is also known as the swing required for the seat to change hands. Given a uniform swing to the opposition or government parties in an election, the number of seats that change hands can be predicted. Swings are never uniform, but in practice variations of swing among the Australian states usually tend to cancel each other out. Seats are arranged in safeness categories according to the Australian Electoral Commission's (AEC) classification of safeness. "Safe" seats require a swing of over 10 per cent to change, "fairly safe" seats require a swing of between 6 and 10 per cent, while "marginal" seats require a swing of less than 6 per cent. The swings for South Australian and Victorian seats are notional, based on calculations by the AEC.

Pendulum

See also
 2013 Australian federal election
 House of Representatives results for the Australian federal election, 2010
 Senate results for the Australian federal election, 2010
 Members of the Australian House of Representatives, 2010–2013
 Post-election pendulum for the 2010 Australian federal election

Notes

References

External links
 Two party swing by seat: Psephos (Dr Adam Carr)

Pendulums for Australian federal elections